A war baby is a child born in a country at war.

War Baby or War Babies may also refer to:
 War Babies (Hall & Oates album), 1974
 War Babies (band), a rock band
 War Babies (War Babies album), 1992
 War Babies (film), a 1932 Shirley Temple film
 "War Babies" (The Goodies), a 1980 episode of the British comedy television series The Goodies
 "War Baby (song)", a song by Tom Robinson
 "War Baby", a song by Mick Jagger from the album Primitive Cool
 "War Baby", a song by Roddy Ricch from the album Please Excuse Me for Being Antisocial
War Babies, an art exhibition held at the Huysman Gallery
 "War Babies", a song by Simple Minds from the album Néapolis
 Younger members of the Silent Generation, who were born during World War II

See also 
 War Child (disambiguation)